Pegram is an unincorporated community in Bear Lake County, Idaho.

References

Unincorporated communities in Idaho
Unincorporated communities in Bear Lake County, Idaho